206P/Barnard–Boattini was the first comet to be discovered by photographic means.  The American astronomer Edward Emerson Barnard did so on the night of October 13, 1892.

After this apparition this comet was lost and was thus designated D/1892 T1.

Ľuboš Neslušan (Astronomical Institute of the Slovak Academy of Sciences) suggests that 14P/Wolf and this comet are siblings which stem from a common parent comet.

This comet was rediscovered on October 7, 2008 by Andrea Boattini in the course of the Mt. Lemmon Survey. It was initially credited to Boattini before it was identified as Comet Barnard 3. The comet passed  from Earth on October 21, 2008. The comet has made 20 revolutions since 1892 and passed within 0.3–0.4 AU of Jupiter in 1922, 1934 and 2005.

It was not seen during the 2014 perihelion passage because when the faint comet was at the brightest of about magnitude 20 it was only 75 degrees from the Sun. It has not been seen since January 2009. The comet passed  from Jupiter on July 9, 2017.

It came to perihelion in 2021, but was not observed because it was close to the Sun in the sky and was not expected to get brighter than about apparent magnitude 23. It will next come to perihelion in September 2027.

References

External links 
 Orbital simulation from JPL (Java) / Horizons Ephemeris
 206P/Barnard-Boattini – Seiichi Yoshida @ aerith.net

Periodic comets
206P
0206
Discoveries by Edward Emerson Barnard

1892 in science